The 1990 Milan–San Remo was the 81st edition of the Milan–San Remo cycle race and was held on 17 March 1990. The race started in Milan and finished in San Remo. The race was won by Gianni Bugno of the Chateau d'Ax team.

General classification

References

1990
March 1990 sports events in Europe
1990 in road cycling
1990 in Italian sport
1990 UCI Road World Cup